Tony Adams (born January 24, 1999) is an American football safety for the New York Jets of the National Football League (NFL).

College career
Adams played at Illinois from 2017–2021. On October 26, 2019, against Purdue, he had a 13-yard interception return for a touchdown.

Professional career
Adams signed with the New York Jets on April 30, 2022, following the 2022 NFL Draft. He made the Jets' 53 man roster following roster cuts.

References

External links
New York Jets bio
Illinois Fighting Illini bio

New York Jets players
American football safeties
1999 births
Living people
Sportspeople from Belleville, Illinois
Illinois Fighting Illini football players